Fool for Love is a romantic comedy film directed by Charlie Nguyễn released in 2010. It tells the story of Dung (Dustin Nguyễn), a laid back employee at a 5-star hotel who is interested in Mai (Kathy Uyên), a Vietnamese American aspiring singer. He is hired by Hoi (Thái Hòa) as a personal assistant, which allows him to go to Nha Trang to pursue Mai.

In 2014, a spin-off film De Mai Tinh 2: Let Hoi Decide was released, focusing on Hoi.

Plot
Dung (Dustin Nguyễn) is low-level employee at a  hotel who is kind to those around him and a hopeless romantic. Mai (played by Kathy Uyen) is an Overseas Vietnamese lounge singer searching for her break. When they have a chance meeting, Mai is charmed by Dung's ability to quickly solve situations with cleverness and a smile. Dung is dismayed to find out that Mai is being pursued by a wealthy businessman named Antoine (Charlie Nguyen), who has offered Mai assistance with her singing career in exchange for a romantic relationship.

Dung meets Hoi, a wealthy, gay businessman, and accepts an offer to be a well-paid personal assistant in the hopes of gaining enough money to convince Mai to reconsider. Dung agrees to accompany Hoi to Nha Trang, knowing Mai would be performing there and with the hope he can feign wealth with Hoi's gifts and property. Meanwhile, Hoi pushes the boundaries of his arrangement with Dung, hoping to start their own romantic relationship.

Cast 
 Dustin Nguyễn as Dũng
 Kathy Uyen as Mai
 Thái Hòa as Hội
 Charlie Nguyen as Antoine
 Bùi Văn Hải as Minh
 Maryline Tâm Võ as Ánh
 Annie Huỳnh Anh as Vân
 Leon Lê as Sơn
 Trần Trung Lĩnh as Trí
 Đào Duy Tân as Thành
 Bình Minh as Trợ lý của Antoine
 Johnny Trí Nguyễn as Johnny
 Nguyễn Hậu as Thuyền trưởng
 Ngụy Thanh Lan as Thư ký
 Trương Thế Vinh as Bar Owner
 Dominic Pereira as Hotel Customer
 Tuyền Mập as Women in the Restroom

Production
The movie was filmed in Vietnam, and would be the first big budget movie directed by an Overseas Vietnamese director. The movie is thought to be one of the first films in a new wave of glossy, mainstream Vietnamese cinema.

Release
The film was released in Vietnam on April 23, 2010. The movie was released to theaters in the United States on September 10, 2011. After its summer run, it would stand as Vietnam's biggest box office hit for a movie officially produced in Vietnam, grossing 18 billion VND.

Reception
Thủy Linh from Thanh Nien commended the summer release for its lighthearted comedy and allowing the audience to have uncomplicated laughs. Jade Hidle for DVAN remarked on the movie's depiction of a modern Vietnam, forgoing references to the country's past, "the film allowed me to experience a welcomed sense of relief that positive movies can be made about and in Việt Nam."

Depiction of Sexual Orientation
In their review for Thanh Nien, Thuy Linh commended Thai Hoa for portraying his gay character as motivated by love as much as the other characters. Nguyen Tan Hoang for Korientation saw the character of Hoi as part of a burgeoning trope, in which  Vietnamese cinema depicted gay characters as  "affluent, cosmopolitan, and modern, these characters’ bóng eroticism is painted as contagious, addictive, and morally corrupt."  Lee Ngo for DVAN asked "Is Thai Hoa’s Hoi an offensive caricature of subjectivity, or is he simply a character who should be lauded for his courageous self-expression?"
In Nguyen Tan Hoang's 2018 article "Fooled by Love: Việt Kiều Intimacy in Charlie Nguyen’s Để Mai Tính(2010), they argue that the depiction of Hoi as queer and as an Overseas Vietnamese is inextricably linked in the character's portrayal.

Sequels
In 2014, Thai Hoa reprised his Hoi character in De Mai Tinh 2: Let Hoi Decide

References

External links

Vietnamese-language films
Transgender-related films
Vietnamese sequel films
2010 romantic comedy films
Vietnamese romantic comedy films
CJ Entertainment films
Vietnamese LGBT-related films
LGBT-related romantic comedy films
2010 LGBT-related films
2010 films